246 (two hundred [and] forty-six) is the natural number following 245 and preceding 247.

Additionally, 246 is:
an untouchable number.
palindromic in bases 5 (14415), 9 (3039), 40 (6640), 81 (3381), 122 (22122) and 245 (11245).
a Harshad number in bases 2, 3, 6, 7, 9, 11 (and 15 other bases).
the smallest number N for which it is known that there is an infinite number of prime gaps no larger than N.

Also:
The aliquot sequence starting at 246 is: 246, 258, 270, 450, 759, 393, 135, 105, 87, 33, 15, 9, 4, 3, 1, 0.
There are exactly 246 different rooted plane trees with eight nodes, and 246 different necklaces with seven black and seven white beads.

References

Integers